The Core Neighbourhoods Suburban Development Area (SDA) is an area in Saskatoon, Saskatchewan, Canada.  It is a part of the west and the east side community of Saskatoon, straddling the South Saskatchewan River.  It lies (generally) south of the, east of Confederation SDA, to the west of Confederation SDA  (west side) Lawson SDA (east side) University Heights SDA and north of (West side) Confederation SDA and (east side) Nutana SDA.  This Suburban Development Area comprises early Saskatoon origins where the first towns of Nutana, West Saskatoon, and Riversdale came together to form the city of Saskatoon in 1906.

Neighbourhoods

East
The east side of the Core Neighbourhoods Suburban Development Area (SDA) brings together the early Temperance Society colony which became later known as Nutana and Varsity View.  Nutana was the first settled area on the east side of the South Saskatchewan River.  With the beginnings of the University of Saskatchewan, Varsity View saw rapid development.

West

With the coming of the rail line, the west side developed, forming a railway support neighborhood in Riversdale.  The Central Business District was initially home to a residential community with the main churches lining the South Saskatchewan River.  The warehouse district which supported the railway line, also supported a burgeoning retail sector as well.  Residential areas soon blossomed north and west of the railway lines forming:
 Pleasant Hill
 Caswell Hill
 City Park
 King George
 Westmount

Recreation Facilities
Some of the most beautiful and highly used parks are along the river bank in the core neighborhood SDA.  A children's playground, Ferris wheel, carousel, mini train, and splash pool are located within Kinsmen Park  This area was initially the home a very early horse race track and then Saskatoon's first farm exhibitions.  Kinsmen Park is home to many festivals, such as the Shakespeare on the Saskatchewan, Sasktel Saskatchewan Jazz Fest, Taste of Saskatchewan and Northern Saskatchewan International Children's Festival to name but a few.  It formerly hosted the Louis Riel Relay Race, a part of Pion-era days a summer festival gathering.

Meewasin Park  is a recently developed river bank trail and park area.  The features now offer nature and historic information trail markers, benches, picnic tables, paved and wood chip trails and an interpretive centre.

The Mendel Art Gallery  is home to changing art gallery displays, as well as a permanent collection of national repute.

Victoria Park features a children's play area, outdoor pool and water slide facility.  It is also home to many Saskatoon riverbank festivals, such as the Dragon boat Races.

Shopping
 Midtown Plaza
 Downtown Core
 8th Street shopping district
 Broadway Avenue shopping district

Education 
Core Neighbourhoods SDA is home to the following schools:

Separate (Catholic) education
 Bishop Murray High School
 E.D. Feehan High School
 Joe Duquette High School
 City Park Collegiate

Elementary schools
 St. Mary School

Public education

Secondary schools
 Bedford Road Collegiate
 Nutana Collegiate

Secondary Schools of Saskatoon

Elementary schools
 Brunskill School
 Caswell Community School
 King George School
 Pleasant Hill School
 Princess Alexandra School
 Victoria School
 Westmount School

Library
 Saskatoon Public Library – Frances Morrison (Main) Branch Library

Transportation 
 STC, The Saskatchewan Transportation Company

City transit
Saskatoon Transit downtown bus terminal receives most bus routes.

Location

References

External links 

Neighbourhoods in Saskatoon